Tawana Kupe is a Zimbabwean-South African academic. He is the vice-chancellor of the University of Pretoria in South Africa. Prior to this appointment he held several senior positions at the University of Witwatersrand where he also founded the Media Studies Department. He also lectured at Rhodes University. Before Rhodes, he worked in various academic capacities at the University of Zimbabwe.

Life
Professor Kupe served as the executive dean of the Wits Faculty of Humanities for six years, between January 2007 and December 2012, after serving as the head of the then Wits School of Literature and Language Studies, and the founding Head of the Media Studies Department. Prior to joining Wits, Professor Kupe lectured at Rhodes University between 1999 and 2001. He joined Rhodes from the University of Zimbabwe, where he worked in various academic capacities from 1988, including as chairperson of the Department of English, Media and Communication Studies. He was installed as vice-chancellor in November 2018, replacing Cheryl de la Rey. Professor Kupe holds a BA Honours degree and Masters in English from the University of Zimbabwe, as well as a DPhil in Media Studies from the University of Oslo in Norway. In December 2019, Professor Kupe was awarded an honorary doctorate degree in Humanities by Michigan State University (MSU).

Current positions
 Vice-Chancellor – University of Pretoria, South Africa (2018- )
Chairperson for Africa – Australia-Africa Universities Network (AAUN), (2019-)

Former positions
  Vice-Principal – University of the Witwatersrand

References

Vice-Chancellors of the University of Pretoria
Academic staff of the University of Pretoria
University of Zimbabwe alumni
Living people
Year of birth missing (living people)